Vasily Ivanovich Demut-Malinovsky was a Russian sculptor whose works represent the quintessence of the Empire style.

Biography
He entered the Imperial Academy of Arts at the age of six and studied under Mikhail Kozlovsky for fifteen years. Upon the death of his teacher, he won a competition to design his tomb and departed for Rome to study with Canova. Success came to him with two colossal statues for the Kazan Cathedral in St Petersburg.

In the aftermath of the Russian victory over Napoleon, Demut-Malinovsky executed a number of patriotic pieces, including a tomb and a large statue of Barclay de Tolly in Estonia. Later Alexander I assigned to him the task of preparing bas-reliefs symbolizing the Neva and the Volga for the Alexander Column on Palace Square.

Demut-Malinovsky also designed statuary and decorations for other St Petersburg churches, palaces, and public monuments, especially those designed by Carlo Rossi: the General Staff Building, the Bourse, the Admiralty, the Mining Institute, the Egyptian Gate, the Narva Gate, and the Mikhailovsky Palace.

Works

References

Bibliography

External links

Neoclassical sculptors
19th-century sculptors from the Russian Empire
19th-century male artists from the Russian Empire
18th-century sculptors from the Russian Empire
Russian male sculptors
1779 births
1846 deaths
Burials at Tikhvin Cemetery